Crab dip, sometimes referred to as Maryland crab dip, is a thick, creamy dip that is typically prepared from cream cheese and lump crab meat. Other primary ingredients such as mayonnaise may be used. Various types of crab preparations, species and superfamilies are used, as are a variety of added ingredients. It is typically served hot, although cold versions also exist. Hot versions are typically baked or broiled. It is sometimes served as an appetizer. Accompaniments may include crackers and various breads. Some U.S. restaurants offer crab dip, commercially produced varieties exist, and some stadiums offer it as a part of their concessions.

Ingredients
Fresh, frozen or canned crab meat may be used in the preparation of crab dip. Different types of crab meat may be used, such as jumbo lump, lump backfin, leg and claw, among others. Various types of crab species and superfamilies are also used, such as blue crab, Dungeness crab and Alaska king crab, among others.

Some versions may use mayonnaise, other types of cheese, such as pepper jack cheese, brie cheese or Cheddar cheese instead of or in addition to cream cheese as primary ingredients. Some may incorporate other seafoods in addition to crab, such as imitation crab, lobster, shrimp and surimi. Additional ingredients may include mushrooms, artichoke, onion, green onion, shallot, green pepper, bread crumbs (such as panko), heavy cream and others. Bread crumbs may be used to top the dish, which may be browned during the cooking process creating a crust. Sometimes Parmesan cheese is combined with the bread crumbs. Some versions use Old Bay Seasoning as an ingredient to add flavor, and some are prepared spicy with the addition of ingredients such as hot sauce and red pepper.

Preparation and service
Some U.S. restaurants offer crab dip on their menus. Commercially mass-produced crab dips are also manufactured. Crab dip can be prepared in advance, refrigerated, and cooked at a later time. It may be served in bread that has been hollowed-out, such as a sourdough loaf. Crab dip may be served with crackers, flatbread, pita bread, bread, crostino, pretzels and sliced vegetables, among other accompaniments.

Stadium concessions
The Nationals Park baseball park in the Navy Yard neighborhood of Washington, D.C., the home ballpark for the Washington Nationals, offers a sandwich prepared with a half-smoke, Maryland crab dip and Virginia ham called "The DMV" as part of its concessions. It was reported in August 2014 that Byrd Stadium on the campus of the University of Maryland in College Park, Maryland planned to offer a large  soft pretzel baked with crab dip and melted cheese that serves four people as part of its concessions. Byrd Stadium also offers other foods prepared with crab, such as nachos and "crab fries".

See also

 Clam dip
 List of crab dishes
 List of dips
 List of hors d'oeuvre

References

External links
 

Dips (food)
Condiments
Baked foods
Snack foods
Crab dishes